Anopina durangoensis is a species of moth of the family Tortricidae. It is found in Durango, Mexico.

References

Moths described in 2000
durangoensis
Moths of Central America